The Canadian ten-dollar note is one of the most common banknotes of the Canadian dollar.

The current $10 note is purple, and the obverse features a portrait of Viola Desmond, a Black Nova Scotian businesswoman who challenged racial segregation at a film theatre in New Glasgow, Nova Scotia, in 1946. The background of the portrait is a colourful rendition of the street grid of Halifax, Nova Scotia, including the waterfront, Citadel and Gottingen Street, where Desmond's Studio of Beauty Culture was located. Foil features on the note face include both the Flag and Coat of Arms of Canada. This is the first Canadian banknote to feature neither a prime minister nor a royal in its solo portrait, and the first to feature a solo female Canadian other than Queen Elizabeth II.

The reverse features the Canadian Museum for Human Rights in Winnipeg, Manitoba. Part of the background pattern mirrors the museum's interior architecture and its ramps connecting multiple levels. A foil eagle feather is prominent, symbolizing ideals such as truth, power and freedom. A quotation from section 15 of the Canadian Charter of Rights and Freedoms appears in both English and French.

The foil window at the base of the note includes an iridescent rendering of the Library of Parliament's vaulted dome ceiling, which can be seen from both sides of the note.

The vertical $10 note entered circulation on November 19, 2018.

References

Unannotated references
 http://www.bankofcanada.ca/banknotes/banknote150/

External links
Bank of Canada's banknote site
Polymer – Bank of Canada
2018 Vertical 10 dollar bill - 360 degree view

Banknotes of Canada by denomination
John A. Macdonald
Ten-base-unit banknotes